Harry G. Gamage (February 3, 1900 – August 22, 1994) was an American football player and coach. He served as the head football coach the University of Kentucky from 1927 to 1933 and at the University of South Dakota from 1934 to 1941 and again from 1946 to 1955, compiling a career college football record of 114–92–12.

A native of Macomb, Illinois, Gamage attended and played football at Western Illinois State Normal School—now Western Illinois University—and the University of Illinois at Urbana–Champaign.

He coached at University of Kentucky from 1927 to 1933 and, during his tenure, compiled a 32–25–5 record, including his best season of 6–1–1 in 1929. He subsequently became the head football coach at the University of South Dakota, where he served from 1934 to 1941 and, following World War II service, from 1946 to 1955.

Head coaching record

College football

References

External links
 South Dakota Sports Hall of Fame profile

1900 births
1994 deaths
Illinois Fighting Illini football coaches
Illinois Fighting Illini football players
Kentucky Wildcats football coaches
South Dakota Coyotes football coaches
Western Illinois Leathernecks football players
High school basketball coaches in West Virginia
High school football coaches in West Virginia
American military personnel of World War II
People from Macomb, Illinois
Players of American football from Illinois